The Moni (also known as the Migani, the Megani, the Djonggunu, or the Jonggunu)  are an indigenous people in the Indonesian Paniai regency (kabupaten) of the Papua province (formerly Central Irian Jaya) of West Papua (western part of the island of New Guinea). They speak the Moni language.

The Moni revere the bondegzeu, a large black and white whistling tree kangaroo, as an ancestor. The bondegzeu was unknown to the scientific community until the zoologist Tim Flannery described it in 1995.

See also

Indigenous people of New Guinea

References

Ethnic groups in Indonesia
Indigenous ethnic groups in Western New Guinea